Aeshna isoceles is a small hawker dragonfly that is found in Europe, mostly around the Mediterranean, and the lowlands of North Africa. Its common name in English is green-eyed hawker. In Britain it is a rare and local species and is known as the Norfolk hawker. It has a brown colour with green eyes and clear wings and also a yellow triangular mark on the second abdominal segment which gave rise to its scientific name. It used to be in the genus Anaciaeschna as it has several differences from the other members of the genus Aeshna. Its specific name is often spelt isosceles.

Identification
A. isoceles is one of only two brown hawkers found in Europe, the other is A. grandis. Both have a brown thorax and abdomen but  A. isoceles has green eyes and clear wings and a diagnostic yellow triangular mark on the second abdominal segment. The hindwings have an amber patch at their base. In contrast A. grandis has yellowish wings and blueish eyes. The green eye of A. isoceles stands out even in flight and in practice it is not difficult to tell these two dragonflies apart. In addition to the morphological differences A. isoceles is on the wing much earlier in the year than A. grandis.

Distribution and habitat
A. isoceles is found in central Europe and around the Mediterranean and, the lowlands of North Africa. It is more common in eastern Europe than the south western Europe; it occurs in Spain and Portugal but is local.

It is found in wet areas, ponds, ditches and marshes, with dense vegetation and, in studies carried out in England, was found to be associated with Water-soldier (Stratiotes aloides).

Status in Britain
The Norfolk hawker has always been a scarce and local insect in Britain. It used to be found in the Cambridgeshire fens but by the early 1980s the populations had greatly declined. It is now confined to relatively unpolluted fens and grazing marshes in the Broadlands of Norfolk and north-east Suffolk. It can be found in Hickling Broad and two national nature reserves: Mid-Yare NNR and Ludham - Potter Heigham NNR and at Castle Marshes in the Barnby Broad and Marshes SSSI. Since 2011 the species has also been recorded in the Stour valley in east Kent where egg laying has been observed and it appears to be spreading. It is protected under Schedule 5 of the Wildlife and Countryside Act 1981 and listed in Category 1 (endangered) in the British Red Data Books on Insects.

Behaviour

It is one of the earliest Aeshna dragonflies to be on the wing with a flight period from May to August. Adults do not spend as much time on the wing as other Aeshnas. Males will fly around over a stretch of water defending a territory and if the pond is small the male will hover over the centre of the pond. Unlike other aeshnas, where the adults seem to be continuously on the wing beating up and down their territory, male A. isoceles come to rest on vegetation from time to time. Females oviposit onto plants and the eggs hatch in about 2 weeks. Larval development takes 2 years.

Systematics
This species was first described as Libellula quadrifasciata, var. 36. isoceles by Muller in 1764. It has since been called Aeshna rufescens and Aeshna chysophthalmus and more recently Anaciaeschna isoceles. It is by this last name that it is referred to in many books. It has since been included into the genus Aeshna and in many books is called Aeshna isoceles: however the original specific name was isosceles. Dijkstra and Lewington (2006) and Boudot JP., et al. (2009) both call it Aeshna isoceles whereas Askew, R.R. (2004),and earlier books, refer to it as Aeshna isosceles.

Notes

References
 Askew, R.R. (2004) The Dragonflies of Europe. (revised ed.) Harley Books. 
 d'Aguilar, J., Dommanget, JL., and Prechac, R. (1986) A field guide to the Dragonflies of Britain, Europe and North Africa. Collins. pp336. 
 Boudot JP., et al. (2009) Atlas of the Odonata of the Mediterranean and North Africa. Libellula Supplement 9:1-256.
 Dijkstra, K-D.B & Lewington, R. (2006) Field Guide to the Dragonflies of Britain and Europe. British Wildlife Publishing. .

External links

Aeshnidae
Dragonflies of Europe
Norfolk Broads
Insects described in 1767
Taxa named by Otto Friedrich Müller